The Haverford Formation is a geologic formation in Wales. It preserves fossils dating back to the Ordovician period.

See also 
 List of fossiliferous stratigraphic units in Wales

References 

Geologic formations of Wales
Ordovician System of Europe
Ordovician Wales
Hirnantian
Rhuddanian
Ordovician southern paleotemperate deposits